Microwave Journal is an American magazine. It was established in 1958 as an industry technical journal covering RF and microwave applications for practicing engineers and scientists. It is scientifically indexed (Science Citation Index - SCI) ISSN / eISSN: 0192-6225. The print magazine reaches 50,000 qualified readers monthly (print and digital distribution). The journal articles are reviewed for impact, relevance and accuracy by their editorial review board making them the only industry journal that is peer reviewed in this market.  It had an impact factor of 0.35 in 2018 according to the Web of Science Journal list. It also publishes in Chinese bi-monthly reaching 10,000 readers in China. In 2017, a sister journal covering high speed digital applications was launched called Signal Integrity Journal. Both magazines are free to qualified subscribers and are advertiser supported.

Microwave Journal is a full service media company with digital marketing tools and physical/virtual events. Their events include Electronic Design Innovation Conference (EDI CON) China taking place annually in Beijing, China and EDI CON Online as a virtual event. Microwave Journal is part of Horizon House Publications which also manages annual trade shows including IEEE International Microwave Week and European Microwave Week.

References

External links 
 microwavejournal.com/

Online magazines published in the United States
Electrical and electronic engineering magazines
Magazines established in 1958
Engineering magazines